Richard Crisp (born 23 May 1972) is an English former professional footballer who played as a midfielder.

Career
Born in Birmingham, Crisp began his career with hometown club Aston Villa in 1987, turning professional in 1990. Although he never made the first team, Crisp moved on loan to Scunthorpe United in March 1993, making 8 appearances in the Football League for them.

After leaving Aston Villa in 1994, Crisp later played non-league football for teams including Telford United, Halesowen Town and Stourport Swifts.

References

1972 births
Living people
English footballers
Aston Villa F.C. players
Scunthorpe United F.C. players
Telford United F.C. players
Halesowen Town F.C. players
Stourport Swifts F.C. players
English Football League players
Association football midfielders